Dendrobias is a genus of beetles in the family Cerambycidae. Members of this genus were, for several years, included within Trachyderes, but removed from synonymy in 2018.

Species

 Dendrobias mandibularis (Dupont, 1834)
 Dendrobias maxillosus (Dupont, 1834)
 Dendrobias steinhauseni Hüdepohl, 1987

References

Trachyderini
Cerambycidae genera